Modale is a city in Harrison County, Iowa, United States. The population was 273 at the time of the 2020 census.

History
Modale was originally called Martinsdale, and under the latter name was laid out in 1872 by Benjamin Martin, and named for him. The present name of Modale, so named from the city's setting in a dale near the Missouri River, was adopted when a railroad depot was first built.

Geography
Modale is located at  (41.620083, -96.011221).

Demographics

2010 census
As of the census of 2010, there were 283 people, 116 households, and 74 families living in the city. The racial makeup of the city was 98.2% White, 0.7% Native American, 0.7% Asian, and 0.4% from two or more races. Hispanic or Latino of any race were 0.4% of the population.

There were 116 households, of which 30.2% had children under the age of 18 living with them, 51.7% were married couples living together, 6.0% had a female householder with no husband present, 6.0% had a male householder with no wife present, and 36.2% were non-families. 31.0% of all households were made up of individuals, and 17.3% had someone living alone who was 65 years of age or older. The average household size was 2.44 and the average family size was 3.05.

The median age in the city was 40.5 years. 25.8% of residents were under the age of 18; 5.2% were between the ages of 18 and 24; 23.6% were from 25 to 44; 29.3% were from 45 to 64; and 15.9% were 65 years of age or older. The gender makeup of the city was 48.1% male and 51.9% female.

2000 census
As of the census of 2000, there were 303 people, 139 households, and 89 families living in the city. The racial makeup of the city was 95.05% White, 1.32% Native American, and 3.63% from two or more races.

There were 139 households, out of which 25.2% had children under the age of 18 living with them, 56.1% were married couples living together, 5.8% had a female householder with no husband present, and 35.3% were non-families. 34.5% of all households were made up of individuals, and 17.3% had someone living alone who was 65 years of age or older. The average household size was 2.18 and the average family size was 2.74.

Age/Gender Breakdown: 22.1% under the age of 18, 7.3% from 18 to 24, 26.4% from 25 to 44, 25.1% from 45 to 64, and 19.1% who were 65 years of age or older. The median age was 41 years. For every 100 females, there were 110.4 males. For every 100 females age 18 and over, there were 96.7 males.

The median income for a household in the city was $34,688, and the median income for a family was $39,432. Males had a median income of $30,417 versus $22,500 for females. The per capita income for the city was $19,111. About 6.7% of families and 10.0% of the population were below the poverty line, including 19.4% of those under the age of eighteen and 12.5% of those 65 or over.

Education
It is within the West Harrison Community School District.

Notable people
 Myra Keaton, mother of actor and director Buster Keaton, was born in Modale.

References

Cities in Iowa
Cities in Harrison County, Iowa